The following article presents a summary of the 2015–16 football season in the Republic of Macedonia, which was the 24th season of competitive football in the country.

League competitions

First League

First phase

Championship group

Relegation group

Second League

Macedonian Cup

Quarter-finals

|}

Source:

Semi-finals

|}

Source:

Final

Macedonian Super Cup

Macedonian clubs in Europe

Vardar

2015–16 UEFA Champions League

Rabotnički
2015–16 UEFA Europa League

Shkëndija
2015–16 UEFA Europa League

Renova
2015–16 UEFA Europa League

Macedonian women's clubs in Europe

ŽFK Dragon 2014

National teams

Macedonia national team

Macedonia U-21 national team

Macedonia U-19 national team

Macedonia women's national team

Notes

References

External links
 Football Federation of Macedonia 
 MacedonianFootball.com 

 
Seasons in North Macedonia football